William Channing may refer to:

 William Ellery Channing (1780–1842), Unitarian preacher of the early nineteenth century
 William Ellery Channing (poet) (1818–1901), Transcendentalist poet, nephew of the preacher
 William Henry Channing (1810–1884), American writer and philosopher
 William Channing Whitney (1851–1945), American architect
 William Francis Channing (1820–1901), American activist, electrical researcher, scientist and inventor